Shotul District is a district of Panjshir Province, Afghanistan. Tajik and Parachi people live here. The estimated population in 2019 was 12,143.

See also
 Districts of Afghanistan

References

Districts of Panjshir Province